Gil Blas (or Le Gil Blas) was a Parisian literary periodical named for Alain-René Lesage's novel Gil Blas. It was founded by the sculptor Augustin-Alexandre Dumont in November 1879.

Gil Blas serialized novels, such as Émile Zola's Germinal (1884) and L'Œuvre (1885), before they appeared in book form. Numerous Guy de Maupassant short stories debuted in Gil Blas. The journal was also known for its opinionated arts and theatre criticism. Contributors included René Blum,  Alexandru Bogdan-Pitești, and Abel Hermant. Théophile Steinlen and Albert Guillaume provided illustrations.

Gil Blas was published regularly until 1914, when there was a short hiatus due to the outbreak of World War I. Afterwards, it was published intermittently until 1938.

In addition to Germinal, Gil Blas serialized the Zola novels L'Argent, Au Bonheur des Dames, and La Joie de vivre.

Gil Blas critic Louis Vauxcelles's phrase "Donatello chez les fauves" ("Donatello among the wild beasts") brought notoriety and attention to the works of Henri Matisse and Les Fauves exhibited at the Salon d'Automne of 1905.  Vauxcelles' comment was printed on 17 October 1905 and passed into popular usage.

Contributors
Some well-known authors who were published in Gil Blas include:

 Paul Arène
 Jules Barbey d'Aurevilly
 Émile Bergerat
 Léon Bloy
 Paul Bourget
 Robert Caze
 Léon Cladel
 Claude Debussy
 Charles Desteuque
 Clovis Hugues
 Maurice Lefebvre-Lourdet
 Camille Lemonnier
 René Maizeroy
 Hector Malot
 Guy de Maupassant
 Catulle Mendès
 Georges Ohnet
 Richard O'Monroy
 Jean Richepin
 Henri Rochefort
 Paul Armand Silvestre
 Jules Vallès
 Pierre Veber
 Auguste Villiers de l'Isle-Adam
 Émile Zola

Controversies 
In 1887, after seeing a dress-rehearsal of Victorien Sardou's La Tosca at the Théâtre de la Porte Saint-Martin in Paris (with Sarah Bernhardt in the title role), Gil Blas published a complete description of the plot on the morning of opening night. Following the premiere, Sardou brought a successful suit for damages against Gil Blas.

In 1888 Camille Lemonnier was prosecuted in Paris for "offending against public morals" by a story in Gil Blas, and was condemned to a fine.

References

External links
 Digitized issues of Gil Blas from 1879 to 1940 in Gallica, the digital library of the Bibliothèque nationale de France, (BnF)

1879 establishments in France
1914 disestablishments in France
Defunct literary magazines published in France
French-language magazines
Magazines established in 1879
Magazines disestablished in 1914
Magazines published in Paris